Phulai is a village in the southern part of Bihiya block in Bhojpur district, Bihar, India. As of 2011, its population was 955, in 135 households.

References 

Villages in Bhojpur district, India